Si Dong Yen is a tambon (subdistrict) of Chai Prakan District, in Chiang Mai Province, Thailand. In 2020 it had a total population of 17,553 people.

History
The subdistrict was created effective 14 September 1976 by splitting off 8 administrative villages from Pong Tam.

Administration

Central administration
The tambon is subdivided into 18 administrative villages (muban).

Local administration
The area of the subdistrict is shared by 2 local governments.
the subdistrict municipality (Thesaban Tambon) Chai Prakan (เทศบาลตำบลไชยปราการ)
the subdistrict administrative organization (SAO) Si Dong Yen (องค์การบริหารส่วนตำบลศรีดงเย็น)

References

External links
Thaitambon.com on Si Dong Yen

Tambon of Chiang Mai province
Populated places in Chiang Mai province